The 30th Infantry Division (30-ya Pekhotnaya Diviziya) was an infantry formation of the Russian Imperial Army.

Organization
1st Brigade
117th Infantry Regiment
118th Infantry Regiment
2nd Brigade
119th Infantry Regiment
120th Infantry Regiment
30th Artillery Brigade

Commanders
08/15/1863 - 01/06/1865 - Major General (from 08/30/1863 Lieutenant General) Svoev, Vladimir Nikitich
01/06/1865 - 07/28/1877 - Major General (from 05/20/1868 Lieutenant General) Puzanov, Nikolai Nikolaevich
07/28/1877 - 01/29/1881 - Major General (from 04/17/1879 Lieutenant General) Shnitnikov, Nikolai Fedorovich
02/06/1881 - 09/29/1888 - Major General (from 08/30/1881 Lieutenant General) Ofrosimov, Evfimiy Yakovlevich
09/29/1888 - 06/25/1892 - Lieutenant General Zhirzhinsky, Eduard Vikentievich
07.20.1892 - 03.31.1893 - Lieutenant General Zeseman, Abunard-Wilhelm-Eduard Emmanuilovich
04/11/1893 - 04/18/1895 - Major General (from 11/14/1894 Lieutenant General) Saranchov, Ivan Semyonovich
04.24.1895 - 01.10.1899 - Lieutenant General Maslov, Ignatiy Petrovich
20.10.1899 - 10.08.1904 - Major General (from 06.12.1899 Lieutenant General) Lavrov, Nikolai Nilovich
09/08/1904 - 04.24.1908 - Major General (from 06.12.1904 Lieutenant General) Shevtsov, Alexander Prokhorovich
05/15/1908 - 11/28/1908 - Lieutenant General Sennitsky, Vikenty Vikentievich
11/28/1908 - 02/06/1914 - Lieutenant General Ivanov, Mikhail Nikitich
02/06/1914 - 10/03/1914 - Lieutenant General Kolyankovsky, Eduard Arkadievich
11/04/1914 - 07/23/1917 - Lieutenant General Karepov, Nikolai Nikolaevich
07/23/1917 - Major General Pozharsky, Joseph Fomich

Commanders of the 2nd Brigade
1874-1877: Alexander Bozheryanov
10/31/1877 - 12/29/1877 - Major General Kappel, Fyodor Fedorovich
12/29/1877 - after 07/01/1878 - Major General Pisanko, Alexey Ivanovich
11/08/1878 - 07/13/1879 - Major General Buddha, Victor Emmanuilovich
earlier 09/01/1879 - 01/18/1883 - Major General Tsitlidzev, Georgy Pavlovich
04/03/1883 - 08/02/1884 - Major General Duve, Nikolai Ottovich
08.24.1884 - 04.16.1889 - Major General Golubev, Fyodor Fedorovich
04.16.1889 - 08.28.1889 - Major General Nazansky, Ivan Nikolaevich
09/17/1889 - 12/11/1892 - Major General Korsakov, Dmitry Nikolaevich
11.12.1892 - 09.10.1899 - Major General Schuld, Karl Konradovich
10/31/1899 - 03/06/1900 - Major General Reiman, Ivan Ivanovich
03/16/1900 - 11/15/1903 - Major General Shchagin, Vasily Vasilievich
11.12.1903 - 28.06.1905 - Major General Vsevolozhsky, Andrey Dmitrievich
12.12.1905 - 17.10.1910 - Major General Korotkevich, Nikolai Nikolaevich
11/04/1910 - 07/08/1913 - Major General Skopinsky-Shtrik, Alexander Alexandrovich
07/08/1913 - 10/13/1914 - Major General Sokolov, Sergei Petrovich
10/13/1914 - 03/04/1917 - Major General Erogin, Mikhail Grigorievich
03/04/1917 - Colonel (from 04/22/1917 Major General) Władysław Jędrzejewski

References

Infantry divisions of the Russian Empire
Military units and formations disestablished in 1918